Datsakorn Thonglao (born December 30, 1983), simply known as Go is a Thai footballer who plays as an attacking midfielder  of Kanchanaburi City  of the Thai League 3. He was known for his deadly free kicks and set-pieces.

Club career
Datsakorn spent his youth career with Rajpracha between 1998–1999 and made his first senior appearance during 1999–2000 season with the club.

BEC Tero Sasana
The young midfielder joined a Thai Premier League club, BEC Tero Sasana in a 2001-2002 season and eventually won the league title with the club at the end of the season. It was his first senior silverware.

After a successful season with BEC Tero Sasana, Datsakorn was given a chance to play for 1. FC Kaiserslautern on a season loan deal. The Bundesliga club also expressed their interest in permanently signing him. However, it was reported that Datsakorn refused to extend his contract with them as he was homesick.

Datsakorn returned to BEC Tero Sasana for the 2002-2003 season and led the team to the AFC Champions League final but lost to Al Ain FC of the UAE 1-2 on aggregate. The same season, his team became the runners-up in another 3 competitions: the ASEAN Club Championship, the Kor Royal Cup and the Thai Premier League.

Hoàng Anh Gia Lai
In 2007, the Thai playmaker went to Vietnam to join Hoàng Anh Gia Lai. He later became one of the Vietnamese supporters' favorites in his two years there, although he didn't win any silverware.

Muangthong United
In 2010, Thai Premier League champion Muangthong United signed Datsakorn for a reported fee of $200,000 (6.6 million baht as of 2010 exchange rate). It was speculated that, due to the deal, he became the highest paid Thai footballer at the time. He led Muangthong to win the 2009 Thai Premier League and became one of their key members. He won  in 2010, 2012 and 2016.

International career

Datsakorn made his debut for the Thailand national team in 2001. He was first called up for the U-19 and U-23 squads for a short period and became a regular member of the senior squad soon afterwards. Datsakorn played for Thailand from 2001 to 2014, making 98 official appearances and scoring 11 goals.

He was criticized in his early years with the national team for his violent behavior, which led him to several sending-offs.

In 2007, he played again and scored two goals in a 2010 FIFA World Cup qualification match against Macau. This was not the only goal that he scored in the qualifiers. The other came in a 1-1 draw against Bahrain.

He won the T&T Cup with Thailand in 2008.

In the second round of 2014 FIFA World Cup qualification, Datsakorn scored 2 goals for Thailand in a 2-2 draw against Palestine.

He was one of Thailand's key players in the 2012 AFF Suzuki Cup. Despite suffering a groin injury, he played until the end of the tournament.

In October 2017, he made his 100th appearance for Thailand in a match against Kenya.

International goals

Honours

Clubs
BEC Tero Sasana
 Thai Premier League (1): 2001-02
 Kor Royal Cup (1): 2000

Muangthong United
 Thai League 1 (3): 2010, 2012, 2016
 Kor Royal Cup (1): 2010
 Thai League Cup (1): 2016

Uthai Thani
Thai League 3 (1): 2021–22
Thai League 3 Northern Region (1): 2021–22

International

Thailand U-23
 Sea Games  Gold Medal (3); 2001, 2003, 2005

Thailand
 T&T Cup (1): 2008

Royal decoration
 2005 -  Member (Fifth Class) of The Most Admirable Order of the Direkgunabhorn

See also
 List of men's footballers with 100 or more international caps

References

External links
 Datsakorn Thonglao at Muangthong United
 

1983 births
Living people
Datsakorn Thonglao
Datsakorn Thonglao
Association football midfielders
Datsakorn Thonglao
Datsakorn Thonglao
Datsakorn Thonglao
Datsakorn Thonglao
Datsakorn Thonglao
Datsakorn Thonglao
1. FC Kaiserslautern II players
V.League 1 players
Hoang Anh Gia Lai FC players
Thai expatriate footballers
Thai expatriate sportspeople in Germany
Thai expatriate sportspeople in Vietnam
Expatriate footballers in Germany
Expatriate footballers in Vietnam
Datsakorn Thonglao
Datsakorn Thonglao
2004 AFC Asian Cup players
2007 AFC Asian Cup players
Footballers at the 2002 Asian Games
Footballers at the 2006 Asian Games
Footballers at the 2010 Asian Games
Datsakorn Thonglao
Southeast Asian Games medalists in football
FIFA Century Club
Competitors at the 2003 Southeast Asian Games
Competitors at the 2005 Southeast Asian Games
Datsakorn Thonglao